Events in the year 2023 in Hong Kong.

Incumbents

Executive branch 
 Chief Executive: John Lee
 Chief Secretary for Administration: Eric Chan
 Financial Secretary: Paul Mo-po Chan
 Secretary for Justice: Teresa Cheng

Legislative branch 
 President of the Legislative Council: Andrew Leung

Judicial branch 
 Chief Justice of the Court of Final Appeal: Andrew Cheung

Events 

 6 January: The largest trial for the national security law against 47 pro-democracy activists begins in Hong Kong two years after their arrest.

Arts and entertainment
 List of Hong Kong films of 2023
 List of 2023 box office number-one films in Hong Kong
 Hong Kong International Film Festival — 30 March to 10 April 2023

Deaths
3 January – Joseph Koo, composer (b. 1931)
13 January – Ray Cordeiro, broadcaster and disc jockey (b. 1924)

References

External links
Official website

 
Years of the 21st century in Hong Kong
Hong Kong
Hong Kong